Juliana Hatfield is an album of covers by alternative rock artist Juliana Hatfield. The album was released on August 28, 2012, with funding raised by fans through Hatfield's second PledgeMusic drive. 10% of the funding past the goal amount went to IMPACT Boston which offers personal safety and self-defense courses.
The album includes tracks written by a variety of artists, including Creedence Clearwater Revival, Liz Phair, Ryan Adams, Led Zeppelin and The Who.

Track listing

Personnel
 Juliana Hatfield – vocals, guitars, bass, keyboards, percussion
 Matthew Caws – background vocals on tracks 1, 5 and 8
 Peter Adams – keyboards
 Ed Valauskas – bass
 Pete Caldes – drums
 Andy Chase – additional instrumentation and drum tracks on tracks 2 and 8
 Brad Walsh – additional instrumentation and drum tracks on track 5

Production
 Producer: Juliana Hatfield, Tom Dubé, Andy Chase, and Brad Walsh
 Engineer: Rafi Sofer and Tom Dubé
 Mastering: Ian Kennedy at New Alliance East
 Design: Jay Walsh at Hungry Head Design
 Artwork: Juliana Hatfield

References

External links
Official website
Juliana Hatfield Covers Project at PledgeMusic

2012 albums
Juliana Hatfield albums
Covers albums